Lillian Ross (June 8, 1918 – September 20, 2017) was an American journalist and author, who was a staff writer at The New Yorker for seven decades, beginning in 1945. Her novelistic reporting and writing style, shown in early stories about Ernest Hemingway and John Huston, are widely understood as a primary influence on what would later be called "literary journalism" or "new journalism."

Biography
Ross was born Lillian Rosovsky in Syracuse, New York, in 1918 and raised, partly in Syracuse and partly in Brooklyn, the youngest of three children of Louis and Edna (née Rosenson) Rosovsky. Her elder siblings were Helen and Simeon. During most of her career at The New Yorker she conducted an affair with its longtime editor, William Shawn. In The Talk of the Town, following the death of J. D. Salinger, she wrote of her long friendship with Salinger and showed photographs of him and his family with her family, including her adopted son, Erik (born 1965).

Death
Ross died from a stroke in Manhattan on September 20, 2017, at the age of 99.

Bibliography

Books

 Picture (account of the making of the film The Red Badge of Courage, originally published in The New Yorker), Rinehart (New York City), 1952, Anchor Books (New York City), 1993.
 Portrait of Hemingway (originally published as a "Profile" in The New Yorker, May 13, 1950), Simon & Schuster (New York City), 1961. 
 (With sister, Helen Ross) The Player: A Profile of an Art (interviews), Simon & Schuster, 1962, Limelight Editions, 1984.
 Vertical and Horizontal (novel based on stories originally published in The New Yorker), Simon & Schuster, 1963.
 Reporting (articles originally published in The New Yorker, including "The Yellow Bus," "Symbol of All We Possess," "The Big Stone," "Terrific," "El Unico Matador," "Portrait of Hemingway," and "Picture"), Simon & Schuster, 1964, with new introduction by the author, Dodd (New York City), 1981.
 Talk Stories (sixty stories first published in "The Talk of the Town" section of The New Yorker, 1958–65), Simon & Schuster, 1966.
 Adlai Stevenson, Lippincott (Philadelphia), 1966.
 Reporting Two, Simon & Schuster, 1969.
 Moments with Chaplin, Dodd, 1980.
 Takes: Stories from "The Talk of the Town", Congdon & Weed (New York City), 1983.
 Here but Not Here: A Love Story (memoir), Random House, 1998.
 Reporting Back:  Notes on Journalism, Counterpoint (New York), 2002.
 Reporting Always: Writing for The New Yorker (non-fiction), Scribner, November 2015.

Essays and reporting
 
  Talk piece on Transit Radio, Inc.

References

External links
 "Nothing for Lillian Ross in William Shawn's will", observer.com
 "'William Shawn - stud or saint?': the memories of Lillian Ross and Ved Mehta" 
 Profile, nytimes.com
 Profile, nymag.com
 J.D. Salinger infosite
 "Lillian Ross does Katharine Hepburn", slate.com
 "'Here But Not Here: A Love Story' by Lillian Ross", old.post-gazette.com

1918 births
2017 deaths
Jewish American journalists
American women journalists
The New Yorker staff writers
People from Brooklyn
Writers from New York (state)
Journalists from New York City
20th-century American journalists
20th-century American women writers
21st-century American journalists
21st-century American women writers
21st-century American Jews